Messi is a 2014 documentary film directed by Álex de la Iglesia. The film explores the rise of Argentine football player Lionel Messi who, at the time of the film's release, played for FC Barcelona.

Production
The film focuses on Argentine footballer Lionel Messi, from his youth in Rosario to becoming one of the world's greatest players at FC Barcelona, and features Jorge Valdano discussing the qualities of Messi with Barcelona legend Johan Cruyff and former Argentina manager César Luis Menotti.  In making the film, Iglesia said he was influenced by Orson Welles' Citizen Kane and Woody Allen's Broadway Danny Rose. The film was produced by Mediapro and distributed by Warner Bros. Pictures.

Reception
After the film's premiere during the Venice Film Festival in 2014, Andrew Barker of Variety wrote that "the film is well shot and very briskly edited" and praised the choice to include figures throughout Messi's career and to not include Messi himself, but complained that they "never interact in particularly interesting ways" and also highlighted the lack of insight into his character.

References

External links
 

Messi (2014 film)
2014 films
2014 documentary films
2010s sports films
Spanish documentary films
2010s Spanish-language films
Documentary films about association football
Documentary films about sportspeople
Spanish association football films